Spionida is an order of marine polychaete worms in the infraclass Canalipalpata. Spionids are cosmopolitan and live in soft substrates in the littoral or neritic zones.

Characteristics
Spionids have a single pair of flexible feeding tentacles with grooves, arising directly from the prostomium. The mouth has no jaws and the pharynx is partly eversible. Some species have small eye spots and some a central sensory lobe. Some of the anterior segments paired gills. The parapodia or lateral lobes have large lamellae. The chaetae are unbranched capillaries, spines and hooks.

Families

According to the World Register of Marine Species (WoRMS), the Spionida comprises six families in a single suborder:
Order Spionida 
Suborder Spioniformia
Apistobranchidae Mesnil and Caullery, 1898
Longosomatidae Hartman, 1944
Magelonidae Cunningham and Ramage 1888
Poecilochaetidae Hannerz, 1956
Spionidae Grube, 1850
Trochochaetidae Pettibone, 1963
Uncispionidae Green, 1982 

Other families such as  Aberrantidae and Magelonidae are sometimes included in Spionida.

References

Canalipalpata
Protostome orders